The 1990–91 season was the 92nd completed season of The Football League.

Final league tables and results 
The tables and results below are reproduced here in the exact form that they can be found at The Rec.Sport.Soccer Statistics Foundation, with home and away statistics separated.

First Division
The First Division title was won for the second time in three seasons by Arsenal, who lost just one league game all season and managed to overcome disappointments including having two points deducted for a player brawl in a league match in October, a 6-2 home defeat to Manchester United in a League Cup tie in November, and missing captain Tony Adams for two months of the season while he served a prison sentence for a motoring offence. Their only major rivals in the title race were Liverpool, who had looked set to retain the title after winning their opening eight games and remaining unbeaten in the league until December, only for their form to suffer and for manager Kenny Dalglish to suddenly announce his resignation as manager before the end of February. Long-serving coach Ronnie Moran was placed in temporary charge, with former captain Graeme Souness returning to Anfield as manager just before the Reds surrendered their defence of the league title to Arsenal. The Reds were readmitted to European competitions after a six-year ban and qualified for the 1991-92 UEFA Cup.

Crystal Palace finished third in the league to record their highest ever final position, although they were denied the chance to compete in Europe due to UEFA's decision to award only one place in the UEFA Cup to England for 1991-92. Newly promoted Leeds United finished fourth, Manchester City achieved their highest final position for more than a decade by finishing fifth, and Manchester United progressed seven places on their 1990 finish by occupying sixth place in the table, reserving their best form for the cup competitions, where they won the European Cup Winners' Cup and were runners-up in the Football League Cup. Tottenham Hotspur, who were unbeaten in the league until November before a shortage of wins for the rest of the season dragged them down to 10th, finished the season as FA Cup winners for a record eighth time. The season was followed by a dramatic takeover deal by computer tycoon Alan Sugar, who took control of the club, cleared debts exceeding £20million, and installed manager Terry Venables as chief executive, although a fresh shadow hung over the club after star midfielder Paul Gascoigne was left facing a long spell on the sidelines after suffering a serious knee injury in the FA Cup final, following weeks of speculation that he was on the verge of a multi-million pound transfer to Lazio in Italy.

The season saw several managerial changes as well as the changeover at Liverpool. Everton sacked manager Colin Harvey at the end of October and brought Howard Kendall back to Goodison Park from Manchester City, who replaced him with 34-year-old midfielder Peter Reid as player-manager. On the same day that Reid took charge at Maine Road, Coventry City completed a £350,000 move which took England defender Terry Butcher to the midlands club as successor to John Sillett, with 31-year-old Butcher being the youngest manager in the Football League. Aston Villa had lost manager Graham Taylor to the England team before the season began, and appointed Czech coach Jozef Venglos as his successor. Venglos, the first foreign manager in the First Division, inherited a side which had just finished runners-up in the First Division, but saw them slump to finish 17th and then resigned to be succeeded by Ron Atkinson. The end of the season saw QPR sack manager Don Howe after 18 months in charge and bring former player Gerry Francis back to Loftus Road as manager. Despite keeping Luton Town up on the final day of the season, Luton Town manager Jimmy Ryan was sacked by the Kenilworth Road board of directors, who appointed David Pleat as manager for the second time. Chris Nicholl's six-year spell as Southampton manager ended in dismissal and he was replaced by Ian Branfoot. Chelsea manager Bobby Campbell stood down to take on a new role as personal assistant to chairman Ken Bates, and Ian Porterfield was named as his successor.

The expansion of the First Division to 22 clubs for the 1991-92 season meant that just two teams went down to the Second Division. Derby County, who made a satisfactory start to the season but endued a disastrous second half of the campaign, went down in bottom place having won just five games all season. Sunderland went down on the final day of the season just one season after reaching the top flight, with Luton Town managing to escape relegation on the final day of the season for the third year running.

First Division results

First Division maps

Second Division
The Second Division promotion race ended with Oldham Athletic as champions, sealing a return to the First Division after a 68-year absence. West Ham United reclaimed their First Division status at the second attempt, finishing runners-up in the Second Division and also reaching the semi-finals of the FA Cup. The final automatic promotion place was clinched by Sheffield Wednesday, who also won the Football League Cup to end their 56-year wait for a major trophy. Notts County then became the first team to win back-to-back promotions via the playoffs by beating Brighton 3-1 in the Second Division promotion clincher at Wembley. Teddy Sheringham found the net 38 times in the league for fifth-placed Millwall, but was unable to inspire victory in the playoffs, and was then sold to Nottingham Forest for £2.1million - a record fee for a Second Division player.

Hull City were relegated to the Third Division after six years, finishing bottom of the Second Division. They were joined in relegation on the final day by West Bromwich Albion, who had already endured the misery of an FA Cup third round exit at the hands of non-league Woking, and were now facing Third Division football for the first time in their history. However, the reorganisation of the league meant that there was one less relegation place this year, and it was Leicester City who took advantage of this by finishing 22nd and avoiding relegation.

Second Division results

Overview
Joe Royle’s cavalier Oldham Athletic side dramatically won the Second Division championship — an injury-time penalty completing a 3–2 come-from-behind win against Sheffield Wednesday in their final game, edging them the title from previous leaders West Ham United, who would be promoted as runners-up. Joining them were League Cup winners Sheffield Wednesday, who finished in third place. Neil Warnock guided Notts County to a second successive victory in the promotion play-offs.

Hull City struggled throughout the 1990–91 season and not even the appointment of new manager Terry Dolan could save their Second Division status. They were joined on the last day of the season by West Bromwich Albion, who went down to the Third Division for the first time in their history. Leicester City were saved from suffering the same humiliation by winning their final game of the season. Albion had sacked player-manager Brian Talbot in January following an FA Cup exit at the hands of non-league Woking, but his successor Bobby Gould was unable to save Albion from the dreaded drop.

Newly promoted Bristol Rovers attained their highest league finish in years, finishing 13th. But manager Gerry Francis then resigned to take over at Queen’s Park Rangers, handing over the reins to Martin Dobson, who was just weeks into his job as Northwich Victoria manager.

Jim Smith left Newcastle United in March after more than two years at the helm, making a swift return to management with Portsmouth as successor to Frank Burrows, while Ossie Ardiles was the new man in charge on Tyneside after leaving Swindon Town. 33-year-old Glenn Hoddle was named as Swindon’s new manager.

Colin Todd departed from Middlesbrough after their failure to succeed in the play-offs, being replaced by Lennie Lawrence who called time on nine years with Charlton Athletic, who appointed Alan Curbishley and Steve Gritt as joint player-managers.

David Pleat was sacked by Leicester City in February, with Gordon Lee taking charge until the end of the season and being replaced by Brian Little.

In January Jack Walker purchased Blackburn Rovers.

Second Division play-offs

The semifinals were decided over two legs, and only the aggregates are given in the schemata below. The final consisted of only a single match.The full results can be found at: Football League Division Two play-offs 1991.

Second Division maps

Third Division
An incredible season for the newly promoted teams in the Third Division saw champions Cambridge United, runners-up Grimsby Town and third placed Southend United all win a second successive promotion. The final promotion place went to playoff winners Tranmere Rovers, who had last played Second Division football in the 1930s, and prepared to thrive as this higher level by signing former Liverpool striker John Aldridge shortly after securing promotion.

Rotherham United and Crewe Alexandra both dropped back into the Fourth Division after just two seasons in the Third Division, with this being Crewe's first relegation for over 20 years, while Mansfield Town's relegation ended their five-year spell in the Third Division. However, the reorganisation of the Football League meant one fewer relegation place in the Third Division, with Fulham finishing 21st but being spared from Fourth Division football for the first time as a result.

Third Division results

Third Division play-offs

The semifinals were decided over two legs, and only the aggregates are given in the schemata below. The final consisted of only a single match.The full results can be found at: Football League Division Three play-offs 1991.

Third Division maps

Fourth Division
A year after sealing an instant return to the Football League, Darlington clinched the Fourth Division title to earn a second successive promotion. Their run of success under manager Brian Little attracted the attention of bigger clubs, and after the end of the season he accepted an offer to manage Leicester City in the Second Division. Stockport County finished runners-up to end their lengthy stay in the Fourth Division, and in doing so their Uruguayan manager became the first foreign manager to achieve promotion in the Football League. Hartlepool United, another team who had endured a long run in the league's lowest tier, sealed promotion in third place, with coach Alan Murray taking charge for the final four months of the season due to manager Cyril Knowles becoming seriously ill, taking over on a permanent basis after the end of the season when Knowles declared himself unable to continue as manager. The fourth promotion place went to Peterborough United, despite the Cambridgeshire club changing its manager twice of the course of the season, beginning with Mark Lawrenson in charge, before switching to Dave Booth in mid November and finally appointing Chris Turner in January. 

As with the Second and Third Divisions, the reorganisation of the Football League gave the Fourth Division an additional promotion place, with five teams going up this season instead of the usual four. The final promotion place was  clinched by Torquay United, who defeated Blackpool in a penalty shootout in the playoff final, becoming the first Football League team to win promotion on penalties, and ending a run of nearly 20 seasons in the Fourth Division for the Devon club. 

The admission of a 93rd club to the Football League for the 1991-92 season meant that there was no relegation from the Fourth Division this season, meaning that bottom placed Wrexham held onto their league status. Joining the league for the 1991-92 season were the Conference champions Barnet, managed by former Manchester United youth team player Barry Fry.

Fourth Division results

Overview
Brian Little’s Darlington won the Fourth Division championship to earn a second successive promotion, while the other four promotion places went to Stockport County, Hartlepool United, Peterborough United and Torquay United. Torquay were the eventual winners, beating Blackpool in a penalty shootout.

Wrexham finished bottom of the league for the first time since 1965–66, but due to League expansion they avoided relegation into the Conference.

Brian Little left Darlington just after their promotion success, taking over at Leicester City, leaving Frank Gray to pick up the pieces at the Feethams.

Manager Cyril Knowles departed from Hartlepool on sick leave three months before their promotion, with player-coach Alan Murray overseeing the final stages of the campaign. Murray took over on a permanent basis when Knowles confirmed that he would be unable to return to the club following brain surgery.

Fourth Division play-offs

The semifinals were decided over two legs, and only the aggregates are given in the schemata below. The final consisted of only a single match.The full results can be found at: Football League Division Four play-offs 1991.

Fourth Division maps

See also
 1990-91 in English football

References

 
English Football League seasons